Benjamin Franklin Bradley (October 5, 1825 – January 22, 1897) was a politician in the Confederate States of America during the American Civil War.

Biography
Bradley was born in Georgetown in Scott County, Kentucky. He served in the United States Army in the Mexican War and then in the Confederate States Army in the Civil War when he was commissioned as the major of the 1st Battalion, Kentucky Mounted Rifles. He was elected to represent Kentucky in the Second Confederate Congress from 1864 to 1865.

After the war, Bradley returned to Kentucky and took the Oath of Allegiance. He resumed his legal career and served in the Kentucky State Senate in 1889.

He died in Georgetown, Kentucky, on January 22, 1897, and was buried in Georgetown Cemetery.

References

External links
 Political Graveyard

Members of the Confederate House of Representatives from Kentucky
19th-century American politicians
American military personnel of the Mexican–American War
Confederate States Army officers
Kentucky lawyers
People from Georgetown, Kentucky
1825 births
1897 deaths
19th-century American lawyers